The Potzdam musket was the standard infantry weapon of the Royal Prussian Army (German: Königlich Preußische Armee) from the 18th century until the military reforms of the 1840s. Four models were produced—in 1723, 1740, 1809 and 1831.

History
Potzdam, just outside Berlin, had been Frederick the Great of Prussia's favorite place of residence as well as the city where the musket was made, hence the name. While the musket is more correctly called a Prussian infantry musket or a Prussian pattern musket, these muskets later became known as „Potzdam muskets".

After Frederick was crowned in 1740, he ordered the then-current Prussian musket; a version from 1723, for his army. The Potzdam musket had already made a name for itself by being the first standard German-made long-gun, and the 1740 model further solidified Potzdam as the key arsenal for Germany. The muskets were widely used by the Prussians and soldiers of the various German principalities in the 18th century. British-hired Hessian troops as well as troops from other German principalities in the revolting thirteen British colonies in America also used the muskets against rebels.

Design features
A smoothbore musket, the weapon was reasonably accurate to about  against line infantry. But a musket was preferably used at a much shorter distance than that when discharged en masse.

The calibre of the Potzdam Muskets was between 0.71 (18.034 mm) and —which was larger than most other major nations' military rounds.

The stock of the Potzdam was usually made of walnut. Stress-bearing parts of the Potzdam, such as the barrel, lock plate and firing mechanism were made of steel and sling-swivels made of iron whilst other furniture pieces such as the butt plate, trigger guard and ramrod pipe were found in brass.

Besides not having fore-sights, Brown Bess-muskets were virtually identical to Potzdam muskets up until 1809.

Many were converted from flintlock to percussion cap in the mid-19th century.

Variants

Model 1723

The Potzdam Infantry Musket Model 1723 was the first standard long-gun of the Prussian Army. It was the rival of the Charleville musket (1717) of France and the Brown Bess-musket (1722) of Great Britain.
These were manufactured in .73 calibre—to enable the use of British military bullets.           
It had pins to hold the barrel in place and four pipes which held a steel scouring stick with a trumpet shaped end. Moreover, could the weapon's rounded fore-sights be used with a crude rear sight in form of an oblong rounded notch in the barrel peg.

Model 1723/Model 1740

The 1740 pattern Potzdam Musket, derived from the earlier 1723 pattern, was produced from 1740 to 1760 and used the same
standardised parts. It was supplied to allied German states during- and after the Seven Years' War, and was also manufactured at Herzberg, Wesel, Schmalkalden and Suhl.

Though the M1723/M1740 eventually gave way for the Potzdam Infantry Musket Model 1809, it was still in use by Prussian soldiers at the Battle of Waterloo in 1815 and beyond.

Model 1809

 
The Model 1809 Prussian Musket, like its predecessor, was assembled at the Potzdam armory during the Napoleonic Wars. It had steel rather than brass barrel bands to reduce costs, and borrowed extensively from the design of the French Charleville Model 1777 Musket. The hammer (or cock) had a decorative heart-shaped cutout, and the steel pan had a protective shield to keep the powder dry in wet weather. The pins were abandoned in favour of three barrel bands. Unusually, the fore-sights were cast into the barrel band rather than the end of the barrel. Even more unusual for a military musket was, that the weapon had a V-notch.

The calibre was reduced to .71 (18.034 mm). The barrels were manufactured separately at Spandau, and were brought to Potzdam for finishing and final assembly.

At the Battle of Waterloo, the 1809 pattern Potzdam was the most widespread musket in use by von Blücher's troops. Due to its large bore, it could fire the cartridges of fallen British and French soldiers, although the smaller French bullets would rattle down the barrel and reduce accuracy and stopping power.

The socket bayonet of the M1809 musket was patterned after the bayonet of the French Charleville musket. Like most other bayonets of the early 19th century, it had a triangular  blade. But it lacked the mortise normally used to secure the bayonet over the fore-sights of the musket barrel.

Model 1831
From 1831 to 1839, the Prussians manufactured a caplock conversion of the 1809 Potzdam musket. These were manufactured not only in Potzdam, but also in Danzig. The 1831 musket was replaced with the Dreyse needle gun in 1841, and most of the old muzzleloaders were sold to the Americans for use in their civil war. These were issued to the Union army as late as 1864.

See also
German military rifles
List of wars involving Germany
Military history of Germany
Swedish Land Pattern Musket
French Land Pattern Musket
British Land Pattern Musket
Spanish Land Pattern Musket
American Land Pattern Musket
Musket
Rifle
Carbine

References

Prussian Army
Muskets
18th-century weapons
Weapons of Germany